Patrick Racing was an auto racing team in USAC, CART, Champ Car and the Indy Racing League. Patrick Racing was started by U.E. "Pat" Patrick in the 1970s. The team is best known for winning the Indianapolis 500 on three occasions (1973, 1982, 1989), and the Indy car title twice (1976, 1989). Patrick Racing acheived 45 Indy car wins (19 in USAC and 26 in CART).

The team fielded its own cars from 1975 to 1983 under the name Wildcat.

Over its history, the team has had three distinct manifestations.

Team statistics

Indy car champions

Indianapolis 500 victories

History

First stint
Pat Patrick started his Indy Car racing career as a sponsor of the team fielded by fellow Jackson oilman Walt Michner in 1967. He became a co-owner of the team in 1970 and established Patrick Racing.

The team won the 1973 and 1982 Indianapolis 500 with driver Gordon Johncock. Johncock also won the 1976 USAC National Championship. The team was closely associated with STP sponsorship, and was associated with Andy Granatelli during the time of the 1973 win.

In the mid-1980s, the team expanded to two cars, featuring drivers Emerson Fittipaldi and Kevin Cogan. The team parted ways with STP, and 7-Eleven became their primary sponsor for 1985. In 1986, Marlboro joined the team, their first Indy car sponsorship program since 1971. Cogan achieved his first and only win of his career in 1986 at Phoenix. Fittipaldi won his first CART race, the Michigan 500, in 1985. Cogan finished a heartbreaking second place in the 1986 Indianapolis 500, after being passed with just over two laps to go.

For 1987, the team secured the use of the new Ilmor Chevy Indy V-8 engine. Fittipaldi won two races, and finished 10th in points. Kevin Cogan, on the other hand, had a disappointing season full of retirements, and parted ways with the team at season's end. After dropping back down to a one-car effort, Fittipaldi won two more races in 1988, finished 2nd at Indy, and improved to 7th in points.

1989-1990 "trade" deal
In 1989, Chip Ganassi joined Patrick as co-owner for Fittipaldi's #20 Marlboro entry. Patrick was preparing to retire from the sport, and began putting the pieces in place to sell the team at season's end. Patrick struck a lucrative deal with Ganassi, Penske Racing, and Phillip Morris. Penske would supply Patrick with two PC-18 chassis for the 1989 season for Fittipaldi to drive. In return, Penske would take driver Fittipaldi and sponsor Marlboro starting with the 1990 season. Furthermore, Penske would receive interim Marlboro sponsorship to field a third car (Al Unser Sr.) at the three 500-mile races in 1989 (Indy 500, Michigan 500, Pocono 500).

For 1990, Chip Ganassi would take over the assets of Patrick Racing (including the two coveted PC-18 chassis, as well as the important Ilmor Chevrolet engine lease), which he would use to start his own team.

The Patrick team experienced dominating success in the 1989 CART season. After winning the 1989 Indianapolis 500 and the 1989 CART championship, at some point Pat Patrick changed his mind about retiring. With the wheels already in motion to dissolve his existing team, he decided to explore options, and was coaxed out of retirement for 1990.

Second stint
As planned, Ganassi split off to form his own team in 1990 (Chip Ganassi Racing). Pat Patrick took over the upstart Alfa Romeo Indy car project previously run by Alex Morales Motorsports. Roberto Guerrero signed on as primary driver with Al Unser Sr. driving a second car at the Indy 500 and the Michigan 500.

The new Patrick Racing team landed sponsorship from Miller. It was effectively another "trade" between Penske and Patrick, as Miller (previously with Penske) and Marlboro (now over at Penske) were owned by the same parent company, Phillip Morris. The services of Al Unser Sr. were also effectively a trade between the two outfits. Guerrero, meanwhile, had been with Alex Morales Motorsports running the Alfa Romeo on a part-time schedule in 1989. 

The team saw little on-track success, and even less success in the engine development. This despite a significant investment by Alfa Romeo, and the retention of key crew members including Jim McGee and Mo Nunn. Al Unser had to sit out the Michigan 500 after he wrecked in practice, suffering a fractured leg. Unser then quit the team.

For 1991, Danny Sullivan took over as primary driver (also another former Penske driver), and the team continued to fail miserably. Guerrero stayed on as a second driver for the Indy 500 and other selected races. That year, Guerrero would be involved in a controversial crash at Indianapolis with Kevin Cogan. By the end of the 1991 CART season, Patrick was in financial and legal trouble. Rumors surfaced that the Patrick team had shipped one of the Ilmor Chevrolet V-8 engines over to the Alfa-Romeo engine developers in Italy, who in turn, tore the engine down to examine it and allegedly stole design ideas. It was returned in pieces and infuriated Ilmor officials.

At the conclusion of the 1991 season, Danny Sullivan left the team, and was replaced by Bobby Rahal. Sullivan went to Rahal's old seat at Galles-Kraco Racing. Patrick's contractual obligations with Alfa-Romeo had ended, so the team attempted to re-sign with Ilmor, or possibly acquire older Ilmor engines from Newman/Haas. Due to the possible fraudulent actions by Patrick against Ilmor, the team was refused an Ilmor Chevrolet engine lease, despite inking the popular Rahal. Facing a decidedly uncompetitive powerplant situation for 1992, and escalating legal problems, in December 1991, Patrick sold the team outright to Bobby Rahal and his partner Carl Hogan. They formed Rahal-Hogan Racing, which is now known as Rahal Letterman Lanigan Racing.

Third stint
In the mid-1990s, Patrick began to rebuild his team from scratch. In 1994, Patrick formed a testing team for Firestone tires, spearheading Firestone's return to Indy car racing. They did not enter any races in 1994, instead operated all year as a non-competing factory test outfit. Scott Pruett signed on as the driver. In 1995, they returned full time to CART competition, as the Firestone works team. A few other smaller teams ran Firestones as well. Pruett won the 1995 Marlboro 500, had three other podium finishes, and placed 7th in points.

In the next few years, Patrick experienced moderate success in CART. Pruett also won the 1997 Surfers Paradise event. After the 1999 season, Goodyear tires dropped out of Indy car racing. Firestone effectively became the exclusive tire supplier for both CART and IRL. As of 2023, Firestone continues to maintain that distinction in IndyCar.

Due to money issues and the constant uncertainty of racing in Champ Car, Patrick Racing jumped over the IRL in 2004. They ran Al Unser Jr. until his mid-season retirement and then Jeff Simmons, Jaques Lazier, and Tomáš Enge. With no sponsorship for 2005, the team ceased operations and the assets were put up for sale.

CART drivers
 Mario Andretti (1981–1982)
 Tom Bagley (1980)
 Townsend Bell (2001–2002)
 Raul Boesel (1997)
 Pancho Carter (1984)
 Kevin Cogan (1986–1987)
 Wally Dallenbach Sr. (1979)
 Adrian Fernandez (1998–2000)
 Emerson Fittipaldi (1984–1990)
 Chip Ganassi (1983–1984)
 Spike Gehlhausen (1980)
 Bruno Giacomelli (1984–1985)
 Roberto Guerrero (1990–1991)
 Gordon Johncock (1979–1984)
 P. J. Jones (1999)
 Steve Krisiloff (1981)
 Jan Magnussen (1999)
 Roger Mears (1979)
 Roberto Moreno (2000-2001)
 Danny Ongais (1983)
 John Paul Jr. (1984)
 Scott Pruett (1995–1998)
 Johnny Rutherford (1983)
 Oriol Servia (2002–2003)
 Gordon Smiley (1980)
 Danny Sullivan (1991)
 Sammy Swindell (1985)
 Al Unser (1990)
 Jimmy Vasser (2001)
 Rich Vogler (1985)
 Don Whittington (1985)

IRL drivers
 Tomáš Enge
 Jaques Lazier
 Jeff Simmons
 Al Unser Jr.

All IRL drivers drove in 2004 only.

Racing results

Complete CART Series results
(key) (results in bold indicate pole position) (results in italics indicate fastest lap)

 Patrick Racing used pieces of Reynard's 97i, 98i, and 99i chassis to create their own unique setup rather than the stock 99i. This setup became known as the "Franken-chassis."
 The Firestone Firehawk 600 was canceled after qualifying due to excessive g-forces on the drivers.

Complete IRL IndyCar Series results
(key)

IndyCar wins

References

Champ Car teams
IndyCar Series teams
American auto racing teams
Atlantic Championship teams